Jürgen Trumpf (born 8 July 1931, Düsseldorf) was appointed Secretary-General for the Council of the European Union and held the office from 1 September 1994 to 17 October 1999.

When the Amsterdam Treaty came into force, he briefly became the first High Representative for Common Foreign and Security Policy but a month later made way for Javier Solana at the Cologne European Summit.

References 
Jürgen Trumpf – European Navigator (Retrieved 2 January 2011)

|-

1931 births
German officials of the European Union
Living people
Political office-holders of the European Union
Commanders Crosses of the Order of Merit of the Federal Republic of Germany